Pain asymbolia, also called pain dissociation, is a condition in which pain is experienced without unpleasantness. This usually results from injury to the brain, lobotomy, cingulotomy or morphine analgesia. Preexisting lesions of the insula may abolish the aversive quality of painful stimuli while preserving the location and intensity aspects. Typically, patients report that they have pain but are not bothered by it; they recognize the sensation of pain but are mostly or completely immune to suffering from it. The pathophysiology of this disease revolves around a disconnect between the insular cortex secondary to damage and the limbic system, specifically the cingulate gyrus whose prime response to the pain perceived by insular cortex is to tether it with an agonizing emotional response thus signaling the individual of its propensity to inflict actual harm. However, a disconnect is not the only prime causative factor, as damage to these aforementioned cortical structures also results in the same symptomology.

See also
 Physical pain
 Psychological pain
 Suffering
 Congenital insensitivity to pain

References

External links
 http://www.archipel.uqam.ca/2996/1/Frak.PDF

Pain
Neuroscience